John Cooper Clarke (born 25 January 1949) is an English performance poet, who first became famous as a "punk poet" in the late 1970s. In the late 1970s and early 1980s, he released several albums. Around this time, he performed on stage with several punk and post-punk bands and continues to perform regularly.

His recorded output has mainly relied on musical backing from the Invisible Girls, which featured Martin Hannett, Steve Hopkins, Pete Shelley, Bill Nelson, and Paul Burgess.

Early life
Clarke was born in Salford, Lancashire, in 1949. He lived in the Higher Broughton area of the city and became interested in poetry after being inspired by his English teacher, John Malone, whom he described as "a real outdoor guy, an Ernest Hemingway type, red blooded, literary bloke". During an April 2018 episode of Steve Jones' radio show Jonesy's Jukebox, Clarke revealed one of his early inspirations to be the poet Sir Henry Newbolt, reciting from memory a portion of Newbolt's poem "Vitaï Lampada".

Recollecting his childhood, Clarke said:

His first job was a laboratory technician at Salford Tech. He began his performance career in Manchester folk clubs, where he began working with Rick Goldstraw and his band the Ferrets. His first releases were on Tosh Ryan and Martin Hannett's independent label Rabid, starting with the EP Innocents in October 1977. Rabid also released his debut LP Où est la maison de fromage'? (catalogue number NOZE 1), which was a collection of live recordings, demos and rehearsals. He toured with Bill Nelson's band Be-Bop Deluxe in 1978 and was signed by Epic Records, who issued the studio album Disguise In Love, produced by Hannett, in 1978.

Clarke has attributed his early success in part to the influence of the English poet Pam Ayres. Her run of success on the British TV show Opportunity Knocks led both Clarke and his mother to believe that he could make a living at poetry.

Career

Solo success
In 1979, he had his only UK top 40 hit with "Gimmix! (Play Loud)". Clarke toured with Linton Kwesi Johnson, and has performed on the same bill as bands such as the Sex Pistols, the Fall, Joy Division, Buzzcocks, Siouxsie and the Banshees, Elvis Costello, Rockpile and New Order (including at their May 1984 Music for Miners benefit concert at London's Royal Festival Hall). His set is characterised by lively rapid-fire renditions of his poems, usually performed a cappella. Often referred to as "the bard of Salford", he usually refers to himself on stage as "Johnny Clarke, the name behind the hairstyle".

In October of 1981 Clarke appeared in episode 2 of series 3 of The Innes Book of Records (TV series), reciting "Evidently Chickentown". 

Clarke appeared in a 1982 music documentary compilation Urgh! A Music War, in which he performed his poem "Health Fanatic".  The film featured live performances of mainstream artists (the Police, the Go-Go's, XTC, Devo) as well as more obscure bands (Pere Ubu, Invisible Girls, the Alley Cats, Athletico Spizz '80, Chelsea) using concert footage from around the world. He also starred in another 1982 film titled John Cooper Clarke – Ten Years in an Open Necked Shirt produced for the Arts Council of Great Britain and Channel 4. Somewhere between a narrative film, a series of music videos and a documentary, the film features interviews and performances by Clarke and Linton Kwesi Johnson among others.

Clarke released Zip Style Method in 1982, but thereafter performed his live act less frequently, spending much of the 1980s mired in heroin addiction, living in a "domestic partnership" with singer and fellow addict Nico. He described this period of his life: "It was a feral existence. I was on drugs. It was hand to mouth." In 1987, he performed live (on crutches owing to a broken ankle) at the Albany Empire in London with Suns of Arqa, recorded two tracks ("Libera Me" and "The Truth Lies Therein") for their album Seven, and featured in the music video for the latter.  In 1988, he made an appearance in two UK adverts for Sugar Puffs, taking second billing to the Honey Monster. He returned to live performance in the 1990s, appearing again with Suns of Arqa in 1992 at The Witchwood in Ashton-under-Lyne.  His vocals from both of his Suns of Arqa tracks have been used on numerous remixes by the band ever since.

Since 2000
After 20 years of performing the same material, Clarke re-established contact with guitarist Rick Goldstraw, who had founded Blue Orchids and played with The Fall and Nico. Goldshaw began handling Clarke's affairs, and the two toured with the Mescaleros and several times supporting the Fall. He also duetted with Reverend Jon McClure at a Reverend and the Makers concert at London's Spread Eagle, performing the poem "Last Resort", which would later be released as the B-side for the band's single "Heavyweight Champion of the World". Clarke also recorded a song with the band entitled "Dead Man's Shoes". Clarke's recording of "Evidently Chickentown" from his album Snap, Crackle & Bop was also featured prominently in the closing scene of The Sopranos episode Stage 5. A live performance of the same poem appears in the film Control, with Clarke portraying himself in a re-creation of a 1977 concert in which he supported Joy Division, despite being 30 years older than the events depicted in the film. "Evidently Chickentown" (recited by Christopher Eccleston) is featured in the made-for-television film Strumpet.

Clarke's poem "Out of Control Fairground" was printed inside the Arctic Monkeys' 2007 single "Fluorescent Adolescent" CD. The poem is also the inspiration behind the single's video, in which clowns brawl. The band's Alex Turner has said he is very fond of Clarke's work and takes inspiration for lyrics from his poems.

Clarke was the subject of a BBC Four documentary, Evidently... John Cooper Clarke, in May 2012, screened as part of the BBC's Punk Britannia season. That same year, Clarke featured in rapper Plan B's feature film Ill Manors and subsequently the Ill Manors album.

In July 2013, Clarke was awarded an honorary doctorate of arts by the University of Salford in "acknowledgement of a career which has spanned five decades, bringing poetry to non-traditional audiences and influencing musicians and comedians." Upon receipt, Clarke commented: "Now I'm a doctor, finally my dream of opening a cosmetic surgery business can become a reality." His poem "I Wanna Be Yours" was adapted by Arctic Monkeys and frontman Alex Turner for the band's fifth album, AM, released on 9 September 2013. On their 2020 eponymous debut album, English band Working Men’s Club pays homage to the poet in the track John Cooper Clarke, referencing his poem "Attack of the Fifty Foot Woman" and book The Luckiest Guy Alive. In October 2020 Clarke published an autobiography which took its title from his poem I Wanna Be Yours.

Television and radio appearances
2015 saw Clarke present a documentary on Thomas De Quincey's Confessions of an English Opium-Eater in the BBC's second series of The Secret Life of Books. He has appeared as a guest on the comedy panel show Would I Lie To You? on 14 August 2015 and again on 7 January 2022.

In January 2018 Clarke appeared as a contestant on an academic version of BBC One's Pointless Celebrities partnered with historian Suzannah Lipscomb; they reached the head-to-head round. He has also been a panellist on 8 Out of 10 Cats Does Countdown. 

In July 2019 Clarke was the guest for BBC Radio 4's Desert Island Discs. A fan of the show for 60 years, he described it as having "all the finality of a suicide note, without the actual obligation of topping yourself". His book choice was Against Nature by Joris-Karl Huysmans, his luxury item was a boulder of opium twice the size of his head and his favourite track was "How Great Thou Art" by Elvis Presley.

In November 2019 Clarke was a participant, alongside Phill Jupitus, in BBC's Celebrity Antiques Road Trip. Four of Clarke's five lots made a loss, giving a total loss of £233.54.

Personal life
Clarke has lived for nearly 20 years in Colchester, Essex, with his second wife, Evie, who is French. They have one daughter, Stella.

Discography

Albums
Où est la maison de fromage? (1978), Rabid
Disguise in Love (1978), Epic – AUS No. 100
Walking Back to Happiness (1979), Epic (Live album)
Snap, Crackle & Bop (1980), Epic – UK No. 26, AUS No. 99
Zip Style Method (1982), Epic - UK No. 97
This Time It's Personal with Hugh Cornwell (2016), Sony - UK No. 34
The Luckiest Guy Alive (2018), Macmillan Digital Audio

Compilations
Me and My Big Mouth (1981), Epic
Word of Mouth: The Very Best of John Cooper Clarke (2002), Sony
Anthologia (2015), Sony

Singles, EPs
Innocents EP (1977), Rabid
"Post-War Glamour Girl" (1978), CBS 
"Gimmix! (Play Loud)" (1978), Epic – UK No. 39
"Splat"/"Twat" (1979), Epic
"The It Man" (1980), Epic
"The Day My Pad Went Mad" (1982), Epic
"Night People" (1982), Epic
"Pity the Plight" (2012 Ill manors album – Plan B)

DVDs, videos
Ten Years in an Open-Necked Shirt (1981) Channel 4/British Arts Council  (re-released 2015)
Evidently, John Cooper Clarke (2012), Click Films/BBC
South of the Border – Live (2013), Click Films/Safecracker Pictures
Ten Years In An Open-Necked Video: the (Early) Archive Performances (2016), Ozit

Compilation appearances
Streets (1977), Beggars Banquet – "Innocents"
Short Circuit – Live At The Electric Circus (1978), Virgin (various artists, features Clarke performing "(You Never See a Nipple In The) Daily Express" and "I Married a Monster From Outer Space"
Urgh! A Music War (1981), Warners – "Health Fanatic"
The Old Grey Whistle Test Volume 3 (2004), 2 Entertain – "I Don't Want to Be Nice"
Poets, Punks, Beatniks and Counter Culture Heroes (2010), Ozit – includes rare JCC film footage from the 1980s

Bibliography

Poetry collections
Ten Years in an Open Necked Shirt (1983), Arena
The Luckiest Guy Alive (2018), Picador

Prose
I Wanna Be Yours (2020), Picador,

References

External links

 

John Cooper Clarke Interview 2012 

1949 births
Living people
Musicians from Manchester
People from Salford
People associated with the University of Salford
Punk poets
English spoken word artists
20th-century English poets
English male poets
People from Colchester
20th-century English male writers
Suns of Arqa members